Chapel Flat is a locality on the Eastern rural fringe of the City of Ballarat municipality in Victoria, Australia. The locality is almost entirely forested, containing the Creswick Plantation and part of the Creswick State Forest.

References

Suburbs of Ballarat